ZNJ-FM, more popularly known as 100 JAMZ is an urban adult contemporary radio station broadcasting in Freeport, Bahamas.  Founded in 1993, the radio station covers most of the Bahamas with its primary repeater in Freeport, and three repeaters to serve other portions of the Bahamas as well: ZNJ-FM-1 100.1 in Marsh Harbour, ZNJ-FM-2 100.3 in Nassau and ZNJ-FM-3 in Coopers Town.

Radio stations in the Bahamas
Urban adult contemporary radio stations
Radio stations established in 1993